Viborg Power Station is a natural gas-fired power station operated by Energi Viborg in Viborg, Denmark.

It can provide 57 MW of electric power from a General Electric Frame 6 gas turbine and a W.H.Allen steam turbine, and 57 MJ/s of district heating. It is used about 5,000 hours per year. The hot water tank contains 19,000 m3, suitable for 15 hours of cold weather consumption.

The station is to be used as a hub for distributing district heating from the coming Apple data center near Foulum and Tjele. Consultants calculate that the best economy for Viborg's district heating is a system where Apple's cooling water is used to provide heat for 7 MWe heat pumps at the data center delivering 55 MJ/s of heating (and cooling for Apple), with an overall Coefficient of performance of 8. The transmission water temperature is raised from 30 to 50 °C and then pipelined 10 km to Viborg, where further heat pumps raise (and keep) the local heat to 60 °C. The start cost is estimated at DKK 316 million, and running costs of DKK 265/MWh, compared to the 2017 price of DKK 413/MWh and natural gas at over DKK 500/MWh. Conversely, Apple's cooling water is lowered in temperature by the heat pumps. Viborg's expected heat demand is between 10 MJ/s in summer and 90 MJ/s (peak) in winter, for an annual consumption of 307 GWh. The heating difference between the 55 MJ/s heat from Apple and the 90 MJ/s peak demand is covered by gas boilers.

See also 

 List of power stations in Denmark

References

External links 
 
 Energi Viborg Kraftvarme A/S at Energi Viborgs website 

Energy infrastructure completed in 1996
Cogeneration power stations in Denmark
Power Station
Buildings and structures in Viborg Municipality